Clark C. "Click" Bishop (born July 25, 1957, in Mexico, Missouri) is an American politician and a Republican member of the Alaska Senate since January 18, 2013 representing District C. Bishop served as the state's Commissioner of the  Department of Labor and Workforce Development from 2007 to 2012.

Early life
Clark Bishop was born on July 25, 1957 in Mexico, Missouri, the older of two children born to Howell Calvin Bishop and wife Jacqueline (née Murphy). In 1959, the family moved to Alaska.  They spent over a decade living in a variety of small settlements along the Alaska Highway and Richardson Highway corridors while the elder Bishop worked in construction.  Bishop moved to Fairbanks to complete his education, graduating from Lathrop High School in 1974.

Political career
With Democratic Senator Albert Kookesh redistricted to District Q following the 2010 census, Bishop won the District C August 28, 2012 Republican Primary with 2,679 votes (47.06%) against former Senator Ralph Seekins and challenger David Eastman. Bishop won the November 6, 2012 General election with 10,051 votes (70.40%) against Democratic nominee Anne Sudkamp.

Bishop ran unopposed to a second four-year term in 2016.

References

External links

Official page at the Alaska Legislature
Official Alaska Senate Majority page
 
 Click Bishop at 100 Years of Alaska's Legislature

1957 births
21st-century American politicians
Republican Party Alaska state senators
Living people
People from Fairbanks, Alaska
People from Mexico, Missouri
State cabinet secretaries of Alaska